Crypsithyris is a genus of moths belonging to the family Tineidae.

Species
Crypsithyris abstrusa Meyrick, 1917
Crypsithyris auriala (Gozmány, 1967) (=Tinea coruscans Gozmány, 1967)
Crypsithyris cana Sakai & Saigusa, 2002
Crypsithyris cerodectis Meyrick, 1921
Crypsithyris chrysippa Meyrick, 1917
Crypsithyris crococoma Meyrick, 1934
Crypsithyris efflexa (Xiao & Li, 2006) (from China)
Crypsithyris enixa Meyrick, 1921
Crypsithyris epachyrota Meyrick, 1917 (=Crypsithyris zymota Meyrick, 1917)
Crypsithyris falcovalva Bland, 1976
Crypsithyris fissella (Walker, 1863)
Crypsithyris fuscicoma Meyrick, 1937
Crypsithyris hebeiensis Xiao & Li, 2005
Crypsithyris hemiphracta Meyrick, 1926
Crypsithyris hoenei Petersen & Gaedike, 1993
Crypsithyris hypnota Meyrick, 1907 (=Crypsithyris soporata Meyrick, 1911)
Crypsithyris illaetabilis Turner, 1926
Crypsithyris immolata (Meyrick, 1931)
Crypsithyris insolita Meyrick, 1918
Crypsithyris introflexa Xiao & Li, 2005
Crypsithyris japonica Petersen & Gaedike, 1993
Crypsithyris longicornis (Stainton, 1859)
Crypsithyris luteocapitata Gaedike, 2014
Crypsithyris melosema Meyrick, 1917
Crypsithyris mesodyas Meyrick, 1907
Crypsithyris miranda Gozmány, 1966
Crypsithyris monospila (Meyrick, 1929)
Crypsithyris nanlingensis G.H. Huang, Hirowatari & M. Wang, 2009
Crypsithyris obtusangula Xiao & Li, 2005
Crypsithyris orchas Meyrick, 1907
Crypsithyris pheretropa Meyrick, 1931
Crypsithyris psolocoma Meyrick, 1931
Crypsithyris ruwenzorica Gozmány, 1966
Crypsithyris saigusai Gaedike, 2000
Crypsithyris sarobiella (G. Petersen, 1959)
Crypsithyris sciophracta Meyrick, 1927
Crypsithyris serrata Y.L.Xiao & H.H.Li, 2007
Crypsithyris spelaea Meyrick, 1908
Crypsithyris spissa Meyrick, 1918
Crypsithyris stenovalva Gozmány, 1965
Crypsithyris symphyrta Meyrick, 1921
Crypsithyris synolca Meyrick, 1917 (=Crypsithyris liaropa Meyrick, 1924)
Crypsithyris thamnomyphila Boudinot, 1985
Crypsithyris trimaculata (G. Petersen, 1973)
Crypsithyris turcica Gaedike, 2006
Crypsithyris unipuncta Gaedike, 2014

References

Xiao, 2006. The genus Montetinea new to China, with the description of a new species (Lepidoptera: Tineidae). - Entomological News 117:535-539.
Xiao & Li, 2005. A systematic study on the genus Crypsithyris Meyrick, 1907 from China (Lepidoptera: Tineidae). - SHILAP Revta. lepid., 33 (129): 17-23

Tineinae
Tineidae genera